Benzelius is a surname. Notable people with the surname include:

 Erik Benzelius the Elder, Swedish theologian and bishop
 Erik Benzelius the younger
 Henric Benzelius (1689–1758), Swedish bishop
 Jacob Benzelius (1683–1747), Swedish bishop

de:Benzelius
sv:Benzelius